Sahand-e Sofla (also Romanized as Sahand-e Soflá) is a village in Mah Neshan Rural District, in the Central District of Mahneshan County, Zanjan Province, Iran. At the 2006 census, its population was 961, in 213 families.

References 

Populated places in Mahneshan County